The Order of New Zealand is the highest honour in the New Zealand royal honours system, created "to recognise outstanding service to the Crown and people of New Zealand in a civil or military capacity". It was instituted by royal warrant on 6 February 1987. The order is modelled on the British Order of Merit and Order of the Companions of Honour.

Composition
The order comprises the Sovereign and ordinary, additional and honorary members. The ordinary membership is limited to 20 living members, and at any time there may be fewer than 20. Additional members may be appointed to commemorate important royal, state or national occasions, and such appointments were made in 1990 for the 150th anniversary of the Treaty of Waitangi, in 2002 for the Queen’s Golden Jubilee, in 2007 for the 20th anniversary of the institution of the Order, in 2012 for the Queen’s Diamond Jubilee and in 2022 for the Queen’s Platinum Jubilee. Honorary membership is for citizens of nations of which the Sovereign is not head of state. Members are entitled to the post-nominal letters "ONZ". 

Appointments to the order are made by royal warrant under the monarch's sign manual on the prime minister’s advice. The order is administered by a Secretary and Registrar, (the Clerk of the Executive Council).

Insignia

The insignia is made up of an oval medallion of the coat of arms of New Zealand in gold and coloured enamel, worn on a white and ochre ribbon around the neck for men or a bow for women on their left shoulder.

Current members
 Sovereign: The King of New Zealand

 Officers:
 Secretary and Registrar: Rachel Hayward

Deceased members

Notes

References

External links

 Buckingham Palace page on the Order of New Zealand
 Order of New Zealand at New Zealand Defence Force
 New Zealand Legislation. The statutes of the Order can be found as SR 1987/67 of New Zealand regulations.

Civil awards and decorations of New Zealand

New Zealand, Order Of